Seo District (Seo-gu) is the largest district in Incheon, South Korea. It has an area , and it has the largest area of farmland in Incheon.

In the past, Seo-gu was part of 'Buk-gu'. In 1988, a part of the ward was separated to form 'Seo-gu'.

History 
 1413: Seokgot-myeon, Mowolgot-myeon, Bupyeongdoho-bu
 1895: Seokgot-myeon, Mowolgot-myeon, Bupyeong-gun, Incheon-bu
 1896: Seokgot-myeon, Mowolgot-myeon, Bupyeong-gun, Gyeonggi-do
 1914: Seogot-myeon, Bucheon-gun
 April 1, 1940: Included in Incheon-bu
 August 15, 1949: Seogot Branch, Incheon
 January 1, 1968: Segot Branch, Buk-gu, Incheon
 July 1, 1981: Seogot Branch, Buk-gu, Incheon Direct Governing City

Seo-gu History 

 January 1, 1988: Part of Buk-gu absorbed by Seo-gu
 March 1, 1995: Annex of Geomdan-myeon, Gimpo-gun, Gyeonggi-do.
 January 1, 2002: Division of Geomdan-dong into Geomdan-1-dong and Geomdan-2-dong.
 September 1, 2005: Sub-division of Geomdan-1-dong and Geomdan-2-dong into Geomdan-3-dong.
 September 1, 2006: Geomdan-1-dong sub-divided into Geomdan-1-dong and Geomdan-4-dong.
 September 17, 2008: Name change of Bulno-dong to Bullo-dong.
 June 10, 2010: Absorption of Cheongna-dong, of parts of Gyeonseo-dong-Yeonhui-dong-Wonchang-dong.
 July 9, 2012: Sub-division of Cheongna-dong into Cheongna-1-dong and Cheongna-2-dong.
 September 2, 2013: Sub-division of parts of Geomdan-1-dong (Oryu-dong, Wanggil-dong) into Geomdan-5-dong, and transfer of metropolitan area landfill from Geomamgyeongseo-dong to Geomdan-5-dong.

Education
International schools:
 Cheongna Dalton School

Administrative Divisions of Incheon Seo-gu

Geomam-Gyeongseo Dong (검암경서동)
Sinhyeon-Wonchang Dong (신현원창동)
Yeonhui-dong (연희동)
Gajeong 1 to 3 Dong (가정1~3동)
Seongnam 1 to 3 Dong (석남1~3동)
Gajwa 1 to 4 Dong (가좌1~4동)
Geomdan 1 to 4 Dong (검단1~4동)

External links

Seo-gu homepage 

 
Districts of Incheon